Four-Phase Systems was a computer company, founded by Lee Boysel and others, which built one of the earliest computers using semiconductor main memory and MOS LSI logic.  The company was incorporated in February 1969 and had moderate commercial success.  It was acquired by Motorola in 1981.

History
The idea behind Four-Phase Systems began when Boysel was designing MOS components at Fairchild Semiconductor in 1967.  Boysel wrote a manifesto explaining how a computer could be built from a small number of MOS chips.  Fairchild made Boysel head of a MOS design group, which he used to design parts satisfying the requirements of his putative computer.  After doing this, Boysel left to start Four-Phase in October 1968, initially with two other engineers from his Fairchild group as well as others.  Boysel was not sued by Fairchild, perhaps because of chaos caused by a change in Fairchild management at that time.  When the company was incorporated in February 1969, he was joined by other engineers from the Fairchild group. Robert Noyce, co-founder of Intel, was an early board member.

Boysel arranged for chips to be fabricated by Cartesian, a  wafer-processing company founded by another engineer from Fairchild.  Four-Phase showed its system at the Fall Joint Computer Conference in 1970.  By June 1971, Four-Phase IV/70 computers were in use at four different customers, and by March 1973, they had shipped 347 systems to 131 customers.  The company enjoyed a substantial level of success, having revenues of $178 million by 1979.

In 1982, Four-Phase was sold to Motorola for a $253 million stock exchange. The former location of the business on N De Anza Blvd is now Apple's Infinite Loop campus.

System
The Four-Phase CPU used a 24-bit word size.  It fit on a single card and was composed of three AL1 chips, three read-only-memory (ROM) chips, and three random logic chips.  A memory card used Four-Phase's 1K RAM chips.  The system also included a built-in video controller which could drive up to 32 terminals from a character buffer in main memory.  

The AL1 was an 8-bit bit slice which contained eight registers and an arithmetic logic unit (ALU).  It was implemented using four-phase logic and used over a thousand gates, with an area of 130 by 120 mils (3.3 mm by 3 mm).  The chip was described in an April 1970 article in Computer Design magazine.  Although the AL1 was not called a microprocessor, or used as one at the time, it was later dubbed one in connection with litigation in the 1990s, when Texas Instruments claimed to have patented the microprocessor.  In response, Lee Boysel assembled a system in which a single 8-bit AL1 was used as part of a courtroom demonstration computer system, together with ROM, RAM and an input-output device. The AL1 is erroneously considered to be the first microprocessor used in a commercial product (vs the Intel 4004, the first commercially available microprocessor), although it cannot qualify as a microprocessor as it only contains an ALU and register with no control.

References

 Lee Boysel – Making Your First Million And Other Tips for Aspiring Entrepreneurs

1969 establishments in California
1981 establishments in California
American companies established in 1969
American companies disestablished in 1981
Companies based in Cupertino, California
Computer companies established in 1969
Computer companies disestablished in 1981
Computers using bit-slice designs
Defunct computer companies based in California
Defunct computer companies of the United States
Defunct computer hardware companies
Technology companies based in the San Francisco Bay Area